Magaliessig is a suburb of Fourways in Sandton, Johannesburg, South Africa. It is located in Region 3.

It is one of two suburbs, the other being Lone Hill, which piloted a waste recycling scheme initiated by Pikitup, the City's waste utility, and Mama She Waste Recyclers, an NGO, in 2006.

References

Johannesburg Region E